Willbeforce Shihepo (born January 9, 1983) is a Namibian professional boxer.

Career
On 6 December 2013, Shihepo defeated Daniel Wanyonyi in Windhoek for the vacant WBO Africa super middleweight title.

Professional boxing record

References

External links
 

1983 births
Living people
Namibian male boxers
Heavyweight boxers